Armbian is a computing build framework that allows users to create ready-to-use images with working kernels in variable user space configurations for various single board computers (SBCs). It provides various pre-build images for some supported boards. These are usually Debian or Ubuntu flavored.

Supported hardware 

 Banana Pi
 Banana Pi M2
 Banana Pi M2+
 Banana Pi Pro
 Beelink X2
 Clearfog base
 Clearfog pro
 Cubieboard
 Cubieboard2
 Cubietruck
 Outernet Dreamcatcher
 Cubox-i
 Lemaker Guitar
 Libre Computer Project AML-S905X-CC (Le Potato)
 Libre Computer Project ALL-H3-CC (Tritium) H2+/H3/H5
 Lamobo R1
 Olimex Lime
 Olimex Lime 2
 Olimex Lime A10
 Olimex Lime A33
 Olimex Micro
 Xunlong Orange Pi 2
 Xunlong Orange Pi 3
 Xunlong Orange Pi 3 LTS
 Xunlong Orange Pi Lite
 Xunlong Orange Pi One
 Xunlong Orange Pi PC
 Xunlong Orange Pi PC+
 Xunlong Orange Pi PC2
 Xunlong Orange Pi R1
 Xunlong Orange Pi Win
 Xunlong Orange Pi Zero
 Xunlong Orange Pi Zero 2+ H3
 Xunlong Orange Pi Zero 2+ H5
 Xunlong Orange Pi Zero+
 Xunlong Orange Pi+
 Xunlong Orange Pi+ 2
 Xunlong Orange Pi+ 2e (Plus2e)
 MQmaker Miqi
 Friendlyarm NanoPC T4
 Friendlyarm Nanopi Air
 Friendlyarm Nanopi M1
 Friendlyarm Nanopi M1+
 Friendlyarm Nanopi Neo
 Friendlyarm Nanopi Neo2
 Odroid C1
 Odroid C2
Odroid C4
Odroid HC4
 Odroid XU4
 Odroid N2/N2+
 LinkSprite Pcduino 2
 LinkSprite Pcduino 3
 LinkSprite Pcduino 3 nano
 Pine64 (a.k.a. Pine A64)
 Pine64so
 Pinebook64
 Rock Pi 4
 Rock64
 RockPro64
 Roseapple Pi
 Asus Tinkerboard
 Udoo
 Udoo Neo
 Helios4
 Helios64

See also 
 Raspberry Pi OS

References 

ARM Linux distributions
ARM operating systems
Debian-based distributions
Ubuntu derivatives
Operating systems based on the Linux kernel
Free software culture and documents
Linux distributions